Fady Elsayed (born 15 September 1993) is a British-Egyptian actor, best known for his role as Ram Singh in the BBC's Doctor Who spin-off Class.

Early life
Elsayed was born in 15 September 1993 at St Mary's Hospital in London, Elsayed on sixteenth year old, joined the drama school The Young Actors Theatre in Islington. He is of Egyptian heritage.

Career

Television and film
In 2012, after getting his first lead role in My Brother the Devil, Elsayed fell in love with acting and knew he wanted to be an actor for the rest of his life. For his role as Mo in My Brother the Devil he was nominated with the Best Newcomer Award at the BFI London Film Festival. He also received an nomination for the ALFS Award as Young British Performer of the Year. After this Elsayed appeared in several TV series, like Casualty and Silent Witness.

In 2014, he played a vampire who spoke Arabic in Penny Dreadful. Until then this was the most challenging role for him.

In 2016, Elsayed was cast in the BBC Three Doctor Who spin-off Class as Ram Singh. Elsayed's character Ram is a student at Coal Hill Academy, who plays in the school's football team. In 2018 Elsayed reprised his role as Ram in six audio plays by Big Finish, and again in 2020.

In 2018 he appeared in the film A Private War alongside Rosamund Pike and Jamie Dornan.

In 2020 he appeared in several episodes of the Channel 4 drama Baghdad Central, and the Sky Atlantic drama Little Birds.

Elsayed was originally contracted to appear in the film adaptation of Black Adam, but due to the COVID-19 Pandemic he was unable to travel to Atlanta for filming, and his role was recast.

In June 2021, it was announced that he would star in the second series of Gangs of London.

Other
In 2021, Elsayed featured in an advertisement campaign for PUMA's Porsche Legacy collection.

Personal life 

Elsayed is a Muslim. He has three brothers and one sister. He is a childhood friend of Little Simz, and has appeared in several of her music videos.

Filmography

TV series

Film

Music video roles

Audio

Awards and nominations

References

External links

Living people
1993 births
People from Paddington
English people of Egyptian descent
21st-century English male actors
British Muslims
English Muslims